Brass on Fire is an album by American jazz arranger and conductor Manny Albam featuring performances recorded in 1966 and originally issued on the Solid State label as their first proper release.

Reception
The AllMusic review by Ken Dryden states, "Albam's arrangements of the dozen standards are still fresh decades later, whether alternating between the trumpet and trombone sections, or showcasing individual soloists".

Track listing
 "That Old Black Magic" (Harold Arlen, Johnny Mercer) - 2:25
 "Happiness Is a Thing Called Joe" (Arlen, Yip Harburg) - 4:02
 "Lullaby of Broadway" (Harry Warren, Al Dubin) - 3:16
 "My Heart Stood Still" (Richard Rodgers, Lorenz Hart) - 2:18
 "My Old Flame" (Sam Coslow, Arthur Johnston)  	2:52
 "Zing! Went the Strings of My Heart" (James F. Hanley) - 2:13
 "Strike Up the Band" (George Gershwin, Ira Gershwin) - 2:04
 "After You've Gone" (Turner Layton, Henry Creamer) - 2:45
 "Carioca" (Vincent Youmans, Edward Eliscu, Gus Kahn) - 2:47
 "I Get a Kick Out of You" (Cole Porter) - 2:20
 "Ja-Da" (Bob Carleton) - 2:17
 "Just One of Those Things" (Porter) - 2:28

Personnel
Manny Albam - arranger, conductor
Danny Stiles, Ernie Royal, Jimmy Maxwell, Joe Newman, Johnny Frosk, Thad Jones - trumpet
Bob Brookmeyer, Eddie Bert, Tony Studd, Wayne Andre - trombone
Al Richmond, Earl Chapin, Howard Howard, James Buffington, Ray Alonge - French horn
Barry Galbraith - guitar
Richard Davis - bass
Mel Lewis - drums
Ted Sommer - bongos

References

Solid State Records (jazz label) albums
Manny Albam albums
1966 albums
Albums produced by Sonny Lester
Albums arranged by Manny Albam
Albums conducted by Manny Albam